Kabul is an Arab town in the Northern District of Israel, located  southeast of Acre and north of Shefa-'Amr.

History

Classical era
Kabul is probably the Biblical Cabul mentioned in the Book of Joshua.

Fragments of pottery from the  Persian period have been found in Kabul, as well as excavated burial chambers, used from the 1st to the 4th centuries.

In Roman times, Josephus calls the town "Chabolo" and camped there. He described it as a post from which incursions were made into the Galilee.

Potsherds dating from the end of the Hellenistic–Early Roman period, Roman, and Byzantine periods have been found. and bathhouse dating from the Byzantine era, and used well into the Umayyad era, have been excavated.

Middle Ages
Al-Muqaddasi visited Kabul in 985 CE, while it was under Abbasid rule. He writes that "it is a town in the coastal district. It has fields of sugarcanes, and they make the best sugar—better than in all the rest of Syria." Ali of Herat reports in 1173 that two sons of Jacob are buried in the town, namely Reuben and Simeon. Kabul was one of the principal cities of Jund al-Urrdun.

Its Crusader name was "Cabor".
 
Remains of a building dating to the Mamluk period was excavated in 1999.

Ottoman Empire
In 1517, Kabul was incorporated into the Ottoman Empire. In 1596, the village appeared in Ottoman tax registers as being in the Nahiya of Acre, part of Safad Sanjak, with a population of 40 Muslim households, 9 Muslim bachelors, 14 Jewish households and 1 Jewish bachelor. The villagers paid a fixed tax rate of 25% on wheat, barley, fruit trees, cotton, and bees, in addition to  "occasional revenues"; a total of 7,926 akçe.

In 1859, the population was estimated to be 400 people, with 30 feddans as tillage.

The French explorer Victor Guérin visited in 1875, and noted "on the sides and top of the hill are found many rock-cut cisterns, a great many cut stones scattered here and there or built up in modern houses, fragments of columns, the vestiges of a surrounding wall, and remains of sarcophagi adorned with discs and garlands."

In 1881, the Palestine Exploration Fund's Survey of Western Palestine described Kabul as a moderate sized village, with olives to the north and south.

A population list from about 1887 showed that Kabul had about 415  inhabitants; all Muslims.

British Mandate
In the 1922 census of Palestine conducted by the British Mandate authorities, Kabul had a population of 365 Muslims, increasing at the time of the 1931 census to 457, still all Muslims, in 100 houses.

In the  1945 statistics the population was 560 Muslims, while the total land area was 10,399 dunams, according to an official land and population survey. Of this, 1,065 were allocated for plantations and irrigable land, 5,539 for cereals, while 56 dunams were classified as built-up areas.

Israel 
The village was captured by Israel on 15 July 1948 during Operation Dekel by the Sheva Brigade. Israeli forces did not attack Kabul and very few of Kabul's residents fled the village. On 8 January 1949, villagers from Kabul with others from I'billin were amongst a group of Arabs, 97 men with 31 women and children, who were expelled to the West Bank at 'Ara. All the Arab villages in the Galilee remained under Martial Law until 1966. Anyone not registered in the November 1948 census was "illegal" and could be deported.

Currently, there are five mosques in the town. In 1974, it received the status of local council by the Israeli government.

Demographics
In 1859 the population was estimated as being 400. In a 1922 census by the British Mandate of Palestine, Kabul had 365 inhabitants, rising to 457 in 1931. According to the Israel Central Bureau of Statistics, the town of Kabul had a population of 7,134 in 1995, rising to 9,400 in 2005. Its inhabitants are mostly Muslims. Kabul's prominent families are Rayan, Hamoud, Taha, Morad, Hamdony, Ibrahim, Hebi, Uthman, Ashkar, Sharari, Akari, Badran and Bouqai. The town hosts a large number of Internally displaced Palestinians from the nearby destroyed villages of al-Birwa, al-Damun, Mi'ar and al-Ruways. All of the inhabitants are Arab citizens of Israel, mostly adherents of Islam.

See also
Arab localities in Israel

References

Bibliography

 
 
  
 (pp. 103(?), 129, 154, 194-197, 200, 202)
 
 

 ( pp. 11, 85)

 p. 192-3

External links
Welcome To Kabul
Survey of Western Palestine, Map 5:  IAA, Wikimedia commons 

Arab localities in Israel
Local councils in Northern District (Israel)
Ancient Jewish settlements of Galilee